Kalamata Football Club is a Greek professional football club based in Messenia, Kalamata. They compete in the Super League Greece 2, the second tier of the Greek football league system. The club's home ground is the Kalamata Metropolitan Stadium.

Creation and early years
Kalamata FC was formed in 1967 when local teams Apollon Kalamata FC and Kalamata Sports Club were forced to merge by the Greek Junta. The Phoenix, which was the emblem of the dictatorship, was chosen as the team's crest and was removed after the Greek restoration of democracy in 1974.

History 
The team has competed in the Greek first division seven times, in 1972–73, 1974–75, from 1995–96 to 1997–98, and from 1999–2000 to 2000–01.

Kalamata F.C. achieved its first two promotions to the first division, in 1972 and 1974, under President Lykourgos Gaitanaros. Its first two promotions in the early 1970s are considered the team's first golden era. The team could not stick in the top flight though, and would not have a resurgence until the 1990s.

Businessman Stavros Papadopoulos bought the team in 1992, while the club was stuck in Gamma Ethniki, the third division.  Upon his arrival, Papadopoulos began pouring a substantial amount of money into the club, and by 1995 the team had achieved promotion to the first division.  The team dropped back to the second division for one season in 1997, but again achieved promotion to the first division the very next year, and remained in the top flight until Papadopoulos sold the team in 2000.  After Papadopoulos' departure Kalamata fell to the second division and has since stayed in the lower divisions.

The Papadopoulos era of Kalamata F.C. saw the signing of many international players from Ghana, such as Samuel Johnson, Afo Dodoo, Ebenezer Hagan, Peter Ofori-Quaye and Derek Boateng. Johnson later transferred from Kalamata to Anderlecht and later played for Fenerbahçe, Hagan transferred to Iraklis and then to PAOK, Ofori-Quaye was sold for a club record US$3.5 million to Olympiacos, and Derek Boateng left for Panathinaikos. Kalamata FC is credited with starting the trend among Greek clubs of signing African talent since the late 1990s.  The Papadopoulos era also saw the uncovering of a wealth of young Greek talent, including Greek international player Nikos Liberopoulos, who made his name at Kalamata before moving to Panathinaikos, and from there to AEK and Eintracht Frankfurt.

After being demoted to the second division in 1997, they eventually started to bring in young Brazilian talent, as well as some veterans of the biggest teams in Brazil. The Brazilians helped the team gain promotion to the first division right away in 1998. According to Brazilian media and insiders, Papadopoulos' son Daniil, a former high level amateur athlete in America, was supposedly instrumental in spotting some of the Brazilian talent and sending them to Kalamata FC. One of them, Hilton Assis (1999-2000), turned out to be the first cousin of Brazil and Barcelona FC super star Ronaldinho. Hilton was once a promising player in Brazil who starred for Internacional of Porto Alegre, but serious knee operations curtailed his career. When he was healthy he was Kalamata's top goal scorer, but he returned to the Brazilian first division after Papadopoulos sold the team.

Kalamata's long-standing rivals are Paniliakos and Egaleo.

Crest and colours

Kalamata F.C.'s official colours are black and white, and the team is known in Greece as the "Black Storm" (Μαύρη Θύελλα).

Stadium
Kalamata plays its home matches at Kalamata Metropolitan Stadium in Kalamata.  The stadium was completed in 1976, and currently has a seating capacity of 5,400.

Supporters
Kalamata F.C.'s most famous supporters' club is the "Bulldogs Fan Club".

Rivals
Kalamata's long-standing rivals are Paniliakos, located in Pyrgos in the western Peloponnese, and Egaleo, in Athens suburb of Egaleo. Messiniakos is Kalamata's cross-town rival, but Messiniakos generally competed in lower leagues.

Sponsors
As for the 2019–20 the main sponsor of the team is the Greek electrical company Volterra SA and the kit provider is Capelli Sport.

Players

Current squad

Honours

Domestic

League titles
Second Division
Winners (2): 1971–72 (Group 1), 1973–74 (Group 2)

Third Division
Winners (1): 2020–21 (South Group)

Fourth Division
Winners (2): 1984–85, 2010–11

Regional

League titles
Messinia FCA Championship
Winners (2): 1980−81, 2016−17

Cups
Messinia FCA Cup
Winners (4): 1953−54, 1982−83, 2016−17, 2017−18

League Participation

First Division (7): 1972–1973, 1974–1975, 1995–1998, 1999–2001
Second Division (20): 1967–1972, 1973–1974, 1975–1977, 1993–1995, 1998–1999, 2001–2010, 2021–present
Third Division (21): 1977–1980, 1981–1982, 1985–1993, 2011–2016, 2017–2021
Fourth Division (4): 1982–1985, 2010–2011
Messinia FCA Championship (2): 1980–1981, 2016–2017

European matches

Notable Former Managers
 Bo Petersson (1995–97)
 Eduardo Amorim (1997–98)
 Andreas Michalopoulos (2003–04)

Notable Former Players 

Greece
 Panagiotis Drougas
 Nikos Georgeas
 Nikos Liberopoulos
 Sotiris Liberopoulos
 Thomas Troupkos
 Kostas Frantzeskos
 Fanouris Goundoulakis
 Aristeidis Galanopoulos
 Christos Kalantzis
 Thanasis Kostoulas
 Sokratis Kopsachilis
 Ilias Anastasakos
 Vangelis Kaounos
 Alekos Dedes
 Thanasis Sentementes
 Panagiotis Bachramis
 Giorgos Bistikeas
 Vaggelis Koutsoures
 Christos Kelpekis
 Kyriakos Stamatopoulos
 Dimitrios Konstantopoulos
 Nikos Zapropoulos
 Christos Mikes
 Vasilios Georgopoulos
 Makis Belevonis
 Dimitris Markos
 Lysandros Georgamlis
 Antonis Mavreas
 Dimitris Spetzopoulos

Ghana
 Samuel Johnson
 Peter Ofori-Quaye
 Ebenezer Hagan
 Derek Boateng
 Afo Dodoo

Argentina
 Elvio Mana
 Sergio Espinoza
 Raul Valian
 Luis Kadijevic
 Armando Gigliotti

Brazil
 Alessandro Soares
 Jeronimo Hilton
 Sandro Luiz Scapin

Albania
 Arjan Xhumba
 Arjan Bellaj

Uruguay
 Carlos Marcora

Serbia
 Ivan Tasic

Sweden 
 Peter Larsson

References

External links
PAE Kalamata - Official site 
Bulldogs Fan Club - Supporters' club site 
Onsports.gr Profile

 
Sport in Kalamata
Association football clubs established in 1967
Football clubs in Peloponnese (region)
1967 establishments in Greece
Super League Greece 2 clubs